The Petite Galerie is a wing of the Louvre Palace, which connects the buildings surrounding the Cour Carrée with the Grande Galerie bordering the River Seine. Begun in 1566, its current structures date mainly from the 17th and 19th centuries. Most of its main floor is now the Galerie d'Apollon, one of the Louvre's most iconic spaces.

History

The foundation of the Petite Galerie was begun in 1566 under Charles IX. Jacques Androuet du Cerceau's Les plus excellents bastiments de France, published in 1576, shows a plan for a single floor, one room wide, that coincides closely with what was actually built. According to Henri Sauval, writing around 1650 but not published until 1724, the wing was one-storey high surmounted by a terrace. He credited the design to an architect named Chambiche (thought to be the stone mason Pierre II Chambiges (1545–1616)). Pierre Lescot, the architect of the Louvre at the time, is generally credited with the initial design, but construction stopped around 1568, as the Wars of Religion gathered momentum, when the walls may not have risen as high as the tops of the windows.

A portrait of Marie de' Medici by Frans Pourbus the Younger, still in the Louvre, is a rare remnant of this series.

In the second half of the 1650s, the ground floor was lavishly decorated for Anne of Austria as her summer apartment, whose ornate ceilings partly survive to this day. These rooms had previously been the venue for the King's Council. 

A major fire on 6 February 1661 destroyed most of the Galerie des Rois, though not the ground floor. The gallery's exterior was rebuilt in the 1660s with a new design by Louis Le Vau, who added a parallel wing doubling the Petite Galerie to the West. Inside, the upper floor was rebuilt as the Galerie d'Apollon. 

In 1849, architect Félix Duban renovated the exterior façades of the Petite Galerie, simultaneously with those of the eastern half of the Grande Galerie facing the Seine. He reversed the changes made by Le Vau and aimed at carefully restoring the designs of the time of Henry IV, based on 17-century engravings by Jean Marot.  On the western side, Le Vau's façade became the eastern side of the enclosed  in the 1850s in the context of Napoleon III's Louvre expansion.

Description

Inside, the ground floor is now part of the Louvre's department of classical antiquities, and the first floor is the Galerie d'Apollon.

Namesake exhibition space

In playful reference to the Grande Galerie (whose name is much more widely known to the visiting public than that of the Petite Galerie), the Louvre museum in 2015 renamed an temporary exhibition space of its Richelieu Wing as the "petite galerie", signaling its dedication to displays aimed at younger visitors.

Gallery

See also
 Palace of Fontainebleau#Gallery of Francis I

Notes

Bibliography
 Bresc-Bautier, Genevieve (1995). The Louvre: An Architectural History. New York: The Vendome Press. .
 Bresc-Bautier, Geneviève (2019). The Louvre: The History, the Collections, the Architecture, with photographs by Gérard Rondeau. New York: Rizzoli Electa .
 Fonkenell, Guillaume (2004). "La Petite Galerie avant la galerie d'Apollon", pp. 24–31, in La galerie d'Apollon au palais du Louvre, edited by Geneviève Bresc-Bautier. Paris: Gallimard / Musée du Louvre. .

Louvre Palace
Ancien Régime French architecture